Barclay Farm (or simply Barclay) is an unincorporated community and census-designated place (CDP) located within Cherry Hill, in Camden County, New Jersey, United States, that had been part of the Barclay-Kingston CDP until 2000, which was split to form the CDPs of Barclay and Kingston Estates as of the 2010 Census. Until the 2000 Census, Barclay was included as part of the Barclay-Kingston CDP. As of the 2010 United States Census, the CDP's population was 4,428.

Barclay Farm House is a historic farmhouse located in the Barclay Farm neighborhood.

Geography
According to the United States Census Bureau, Barclay Farm had a total area of 1.659 square miles (4.297 km2), all of which was land.

Demographics

Census 2010

References

Census-designated places in Camden County, New Jersey
Neighborhoods in Cherry Hill, New Jersey